The 1997 Davis Cup (also known as the 1997 Davis Cup by NEC for sponsorship purposes) was the 86th edition of the Davis Cup, the most important tournament between national teams in men's tennis. 127 teams entered the competition, 16 in the World Group, 25 in the Americas Zone, 29 in the Asia/Oceania Zone, and 57 in the Europe/Africa Zone. A new Group VI of competition was added to each regional zone, providing another level of promotion and relegation within each zone. Madagascar, Tajikistan and Uganda made their first appearances in the tournament.

Sweden defeated the United States in the final, held at the Scandinavium in Gothenburg, Sweden, on 28–30 November, to win their 6th title overall.

World Group

Draw

Final
Sweden vs. United States

World Group Qualifying Round

Date: 19–21 September

The eight losing teams in the World Group first round ties and eight winners of the Zonal Group I final round ties competed in the World Group Qualifying Round for spots in the 1998 World Group.

Americas Zone

Group I

Group II

Group III
 Venue: Southampton Princess Hotel, Southampton, Bermuda
 Date: 29 April–3 May

Final standings

  and  promoted to Group II in 1998.
  and  relegated to Group IV in 1998.

Group IV
 Venue: Southampton Princess Hotel, Southampton, Bermuda
 Date: 1–3 May

Final standings

  and  promoted to Group III in 1998.

Asia/Oceania Zone

Group I

Group II

Group III
 Venue: Khalifa International Tennis and Squash Complex, Doha, Qatar
 Date: 26–30 March

Final standings

  and  promoted to Group II in 1998.
  and  relegated to Group IV in 1998.

Group IV
 Venue: InterContinental Hotel, Muscat, Oman
 Date: 26–30 March

Final standings

  and  promoted to Group III in 1998.

Europe/Africa Zone

Group I

Group II

Group III

Zone A
 Venue: Dakar Olympic Club, Dakar, Senegal
 Date: 22–26 January

Final standings

  and  promoted to Group II in 1998.
  and  relegated to Group IV in 1998.

Zone B
 Venue: Lokomotiv Tennis Club, Plovdiv, Bulgaria
 Date: 21–25 May

Final standings

  and  promoted to Group II in 1998.
  and  relegated to Group IV in 1998.

Group IV

Zone A
 Venue: Tennis Centre, Gaborone, Botswana
 Date: 19–23 March

Final standings

  and  promoted to Group III in 1998.

Zone B
 Venue: Field Club, Nicosia, Cyprus
 Date: 21–25 May

Final standings

  and  promoted to Group III in 1998.

References
General

Specific

External links
Davis Cup Official Website
Davis Cup at SVT's open archive (including the 1997 tournament) 

 
Davis Cups by year
Davis Cup
Davis Cup